The flag of Brunei has a centered emblem of Brunei on a yellow field cut by black and white diagonal stripes (parallelograms at an angle). The yellow field represents the sultan of Brunei. The red crest consists of a crescent facing upwards, joined with a parasol, with hands on the sides. Black and white stripes run across the flag.

In Southeast Asia, yellow is traditionally the color of royalty, and the royal standards of Malaysia and Thailand, and the flag of Sarawak, along with the presidential flag of Indonesia, all use a yellow field as well. The crescent symbolizes Islam, the parasol symbolizes monarchy, and the hands at the side symbolize the benevolence of the government. The black and white stripes represent Brunei's chief ministers who were once joint-regents and then – after the sultan came of age – senior advisors: the Pengiran Bendahara (First Minister, symbolised by a slightly thicker white stripe) and the Pengiran Pemancha (Second Minister, governing foreign affairs, symbolised by black), with the white stripe being roughly 12% wider than the black one.

Below this is a banner inscribed with the name of the country in Jawi: ; Brunei Darussalam, which means ‘Brunei, the Abode of Peace’

It is one of the few national flags incorporating a diagonal line, with other examples including the DR Congo, Tanzania, Namibia, and Trinidad and Tobago.

History
The flag in its present form, except for the crest, has been in use since 1906 when Brunei became a British protectorate, following the signing of an agreement between Brunei and Great Britain. Even though Brunei was only nominally independent after this, Bruneians retained certain symbols, like the flag.

The crest was superimposed in 1959 after the promulgation of the Constitution of 29 September 1959.

The design was retained when the country gained full independence on 1 January 1984 as Brunei Darussalam (Brunei, Abode of Peace).

Other ensigns and flags

Personal standards

The standard of Her Majesty the Raja Isteri is light yellow, incorporating the Sultan's crest on red background at the centre of the standard.

The Perdana Wazir has also a personal standard granted to him by His Majesty the Sultan. The standard is white superimposed in the centre with the state crest in light yellow. The crest is supported by si kikil, a kris crossed by its sheath.

The personal standards of the Pengiran Bendahara, Pengiran Digadong, Pengiran Pemancha and Pengiran Temenggong (senior ministers) are white, green, black and red respectively.

The Sultan had also bestowed personal flags to lesser officials known as Pengiran Cheteria and to Pengiran and other subjects.

Among the Pengiran and dignitaries who are authorised to use personal standards are:

 Descendants of a sultan, down to four generations,
 Descendants of a wazir, down to three generations,
 Descendants of a cheteria, down to two generations,
 From menteri (non-noble officials) to damong (chiefs).

Their personal standards incorporate the state crest in red on a yellow background at the top left corner of the flags.

Colors

References

External links

 
 National Flag and Crest Government of Brunei Darussalam
 National Flag and Crest, Prime Minister's Office
 Flag and Crest Description 
 History Brunei Flag

Flags introduced in 1959
National flags
Flag
Brunei
1959 establishments in Brunei